Loek Cohen (born 4 March 1946) is a Dutch former professional footballer who played in the Eredivisie for USV Elinkwijk. Cohen, a forward, was also on the books of Ajax and of Amsterdam club ASV Arsenal.

References

1946 births
Living people
Association football forwards
Dutch footballers
AFC Ajax players
USV Elinkwijk players
Eredivisie players